Hypsopygia datames is a species of snout moth in the genus Hypsopygia. It was described by Herbert Druce in 1900. It is found in Mexico.

References

Moths described in 1900
Pyralini